The 1962–63 Irish Cup was the 83rd edition of the premier knock-out cup competition in Northern Irish football. 

Linfield won the cup for the 29th time and second consecutive year, defeating Distillery 2–1 in the final at The Oval.

Results

First round

|}

Replay

|}

Quarter-finals

|}

Semi-finals

|}

Final

References

External links
The Rec.Sport.Soccer Statistics Foundation - Northern Ireland - Cup Finals

Irish Cup seasons
1962–63 in Northern Ireland association football
1962–63 domestic association football cups